This is a list of moths of the family Gelechiidae that are found in India. It also acts as an index to the species articles and forms part of the full List of moths of India.

Acribologa citharista (Meyrick, 1913)
Acribologa malacodes (Meyrick, 1910)
Amblypalpis olivierella Ragonot, 1886
Anacampsis rivalis Meyrick, 1918
Anacampsis specularis (Meyrick, 1918)
Anarsia acerata Meyrick, 1913
Anarsia acrotoma Meyrick, 1913
Anarsia altercata Meyrick, 1918
Anarsia didymopa Meyrick, 1916
Anarsia ephippias Meyrick, 1908
Anarsia epotias Meyrick, 1916
Anarsia idioptila Meyrick, 1916
Anarsia isogona Meyrick, 1913
Anarsia melanoplecta Meyrick, 1914
Anarsia omoptila Meyrick, 1918
Anarsia parkae Rose and Pathania, 2003
Anarsia patulella (Walker, 1864)
Anarsia phortica Meyrick, 1913
Anarsia reciproca Meyrick, 1920
Anarsia renukaensis Rose and Pathania, 2003
Anarsia sagittaria Meyrick, 1914
Anarsia sagmatica Meyrick, 1916
Anarsia tanyharensis Rose and Pathania, 2003
Anarsia tegumentus Rose and Pathania, 2003
Anarsia triaenota Meyrick, 1913
Anarsia triglypta Meyrick, 1933
Anarsia valvata Rose and Pathania, 2003
Anarsia veruta Meyrick, 1918
Apatetris caecivaga Meyrick, 1928
Apatetris leucoglypta Meyrick, 1918
Apethistis consummata (Meyrick, 1923)
Apethistis inspersa (Meyrick, 1921)
Apethistis insulsa (Meyrick, 1914)
Apethistis officiosa (Meyrick, 1918)
Apethistis purificata Meyrick, 1931
Apethistis sitiens (Meyrick, 1918)
Apethistis superans Meyrick, 1926
Aphanostola atripalpis Meyrick, 1931
Aphanostola intercepta Meyrick, 1932
Aproaerema modicella Deventer, 1904
Aristotelia agatha Meyrick, 1918
Aristotelia articulata Meyrick, 1918
Aristotelia asthenodes Meyrick, 1923
Aristotelia aulacopis Meyrick, 1923
Aristotelia brochodesma Meyrick, 1908
Aristotelia citrocosma Meyrick, 1908
Aristotelia defixa Meyrick, 1929
Aristotelia galeotis Meyrick, 1908
Aristotelia incitata Meyrick, 1918
Aristotelia ingravata Meyrick, 1918
Aristotelia juvenilis Meyrick, 1929
Aristotelia leptocentra Meyrick, 1912
Aristotelia leucophanta Meyrick, 1908
Aristotelia oxythectis Meyrick, 1929
Aristotelia palamota Meyrick, 1926
Aristotelia panchromatica (Meyrick, 1926)
Aristotelia paraleuca Meyrick, 1929
Aristotelia repudiata Meyrick, 1923
Aristotelia resinosa Meyrick, 1918
Aristotelia stipella (Hübner, 1796)
Aristotelia thalamitis Meyrick, 1908
Aristotelia zetetica Meyrick, 1934
Aroga peperistis (Meyrick, 1926)
Aulidiotis phoxopterella (Snellen, 1903)
Autosticha acharacta Meyrick, 1918
Autosticha ansata Meyrick, 1931
Autosticha auxodelta Meyrick, 1916
Autosticha conciliata Meyrick, 1918
Autosticha encycota Meyrick, 1922
Autosticha enervata Meyrick, 1929
Autosticha exemplaris Meyrick, 1916
Autosticha spilochorda Meyrick, 1916
Autosticha stagmatopis Meyrick, 1923
Autosticha tetrapeda Meyrick, 1908
Battaristis specularis Meyrick, 1914
Brachmia arotraea (Meyrick, 1894)
Brachmia carphodes (Meyrick, 1908)
Brachmia cenchritis Meyrick, 1911
Brachmia consummata Meyrick, 1923
Brachmia convolvuli (Walsingham, 1908)
Brachmia craterospila Meyrick, 1923
Brachmia custos Meyrick, 1911
Brachmia dryotyphla Meyrick, 1937
Brachmia engrapta Meyrick, 1918
Brachmia idiastis Meyrick, 1916
Brachmia inspersa Meyrick, 1921
Brachmia lochistis Meyrick, 1911
Brachmia macroscopa Meyrick, 1932
Brachmia officiosa Meyrick, 1918
Brachmia parasema Meyrick, 1913
Brachmia perumbrata Meyrick, 1918
Brachmia philomusa Meyrick, 1918
Brachmia planicola Meyrick, 1932
Brachmia ptochodryas Meyrick, 1923
Brachmia resoluta Meyrick, 1918
Brachmia sitiens Meyrick, 1918
Brachmia stactopis Meyrick, 1931
Brachmia syntonopis Meyrick, 1923
Brachmia vecors Meyrick, 1918
Brachmia xerastis (Meyrick, 1905)
Brachyacma aprica (Meyrick, 1913)
Brachyacma tabellata (Meyrick, 1913)
Brachyacma trychota Meyrick, 1929
Bucolarcha geodes Meyrick, 1929
Carbatina picrocarpa Meyrick, 1913
Chelaria anguinea Meyrick, 1913
Chelaria antiastis Meyrick, 1929
Chelaria caryodora Meyrick, 1913
Chelaria cirrhospila Meyrick, 1920
Chelaria cymoptila Meyrick, 1929
Chelaria ephippiastis Meyrick, 1937
Chelaria haligramma Meyrick, 1926
Chelaria isopogon Meyrick, 1929
Chelaria isoptila Meyrick, 1913
Chelaria lactifera Meyrick, 1913
Chelaria levata Meyrick, 1920
Chelaria obtruncata Meyrick, 1923
Chelaria polemica Meyrick, 1935
Chelaria rhicnota Meyrick, 1916
Chelaria scopulosa Meyrick, 1913
Chelaria silvestris Meyrick, 1913
Chelaria spathota Meyrick, 1913
Chelaria stictocosma Meyrick, 1920
Chelaria taphronoma Meyrick, 1932
Chelaria tephroptila Meyrick, 1931
Chelaria tonsa Meyrick, 1913
Chelaria verticosa Meyrick, 1913
Cnaphostola adamantina Meyrick, 1918
Coconympha iriarcha Meyrick, 1931
Colpomorpha orthomeris Meyrick, 1929
Corthyntis chlorotricha Meyrick, 1916
Crocogma isocola Meyrick, 1918
Cymotricha antisticta Meyrick, 1929
Cymotricha chlanidota (Meyrick, 1927)
Cymotricha cymatodes (Meyrick, 1916)
Cymotricha illicita Meyrick, 1929
Cymotricha metatoxa Meyrick, 1935
Cymotricha pelitis (Meyrick, 1913)
Cymotricha pseudometra (Meyrick, 1913)
Cymotricha tephroxesta Meyrick, 1931
Cymotricha tetraschema Meyrick, 1931
Deimnestra thyrsicola (Meyrick, 1913)
Demopractis tonaea Meyrick, 1918
Desmophylax barymochla Meyrick, 1935
Diastaltica asymmetria Walia and Wadhawan, 2006
Dichomeris acuminata (Staudinger, 1876)
Dichomeris allantopa Meyrick, 1934
Dichomeris bispotal Walia and Wadhawan, 2004
Dichomeris brachygrapha Meyrick, 1920
Dichomeris ceponoma Meyrick, 1918
Dichomeris crepitatrix Meyrick, 1913
Dichomeris eridantis (Meyrick, 1907)
Dichomeris excoriata Meyrick, 1913
Dichomeris ferrata Meyrick, 1913
Dichomeris ferruginosa Meyrick, 1913
Dichomeris fuscodelta Walia and Wadhawan, 2004
Dichomeris hansi Walia and Wadhawan, 2004
Dichomeris hastata Meyrick, 1918
Dichomeris ianthes (Meyrick,1887)
Dichomeris imbricata Meyrick, 1913
Dichomeris intensa Meyrick, 1913
Dichomeris kalesarensis Walia and W adhawan, 2004
Dichomeris leucothicta Meyrick, 1919
Dichomeris lissota Meyrick, 1913
Dichomeris malachias (Meyrick, 1913)
Dichomeris melanortha Meyrick, 1929
Dichomeris mesoglena Meyrick, 1923
Dichomeris metrodes Meyrick, 1913
Dichomeris petalodes Meyrick, 1934
Dichomeris ptychosema Meyrick, 1913
Dichomeris quercicola Meyrick, 1921
Dichomeris rasilella (Herrich-Schäffer, 1855)
Dichomeris sciodora Meyrick, 1922
Dichomeris sciritis (Meyrick, 1918)
Dichomeris sicaellus Pathania and Rose, 2003
Dichomeris sicasymmetria Walia and Wadhawan, 2004
Dichomeris summata Meyrick, 1913
Dichomeris viridella (Snellen, 1901)
Empedaula insipiens Meyrick, 1918
Encolpotis heliopepta Meyrick, 1918
Encrasima communicata Meyrick, 1918
Enthetica picryntis Meyrick, 1916
Enthetica tribrachia Meyrick, 1923
Ephysteris chersaea Meyrick, 1908
Ephysteris suasoria Meyrick, 1918
Ephysteris subcaerulea Meyrick, 1918
Epimimastis emblematica Meyrick, 1916
Epimimastis glaucodes Meyrick, 1910
Epithectis palaeris Meyrick, 1895
Ficulea blandulella Walker, 1864
Gaesa decusella Walker, 1864
Gaesa leucothicta (Meyrick, 1922)
Gaesa melitura (Meyrick, 1916)
Gaesa semnias Meyrick, 1926
Gelechia biclavala Meyrick, 1934
Gelechia horiaula Meyrick, 1918
Gelechia luticoma Meyrick, 1929
Gelechia planodes Meyrick, 1918
Gelechia stenacma Meyrick, 1935
Gelechia trachydyta Meyrick, 1920
Gnorimoschema atomatma (Meyrick, 1932)
Gnorimoschema blapsigona (Meyrick, 1916)
Gnorimoschema dryosyrta (Meyrick, 1931)
Gnorimoschema ergasima (Meyrick, 1916)
Gnorimoschema horoscopa (Meyrick, 1926)
Gnorimoschema machinata (Meyrick, 1929)
Gnorimoschema ramulata (Meyrick, 1926)
Gnorimoschema subcaerulea (Meyrick, 1918)
Gnorimoschema tetrameris (Meyrick, 1926)
Gnorimoschema trachydyta (Meyrick, 1920)
Helcystogramma arotraea Meyrick, 1894
Helcystogramma clarkei Rose and Pathania, 2003
Helcystogramma cyanozona (Meyrick, 1923)
Helcystogramma hibisci (Stainton, 1859)
Helcystogramma hoplophora (Meyrick, 1916)
Helcystogramma leucoplecta (Meyrick, 1911)
Helcystogramma uedai Rose and Pathania, 2003
Heliangara macaritis Meyrick, 1910
Heteralcis bathroptila Meyrick, 1925
Heteroderces oxylitha Meyrick, 1929
Hypatima spathota (Meyrick, 1913)
Hypatima tephroptila (Meyrick, 1931)
Hypatima vinculata Pathania and Rose, 2003
Hypelictis acrochlora (Meyrick, 1905)
Hypelictis albiscripta Meyrick, 1914
Hypelictis frenigera Meyrick, 1913
Hypelictis lupata Meyrick, 1913
Hypochasmia cirrhocrena Meyrick, 1929
Idiophantis acanthopa Meyrick, 1931
Idiophantis carpotoma Meyrick, 1916
Idiophantis chalcura Meyrick, 1907
Idiophantis hemiphaea Meyrick, 1907
Idiophantis melanosacta Meyrick, 1907
Idiophantis stoica Meyrick, 1907
Inotica gaesata Meyrick, 1913
Ischnophenax streblopis Meyrick, 1931
Istrianis brucinella (Mann, 1872)
Istrianis crauropa Meyrick, 1918
Istrianis steganotricha (Meyrick, 1935)
Kiwaia ramulata (Meyrick, 1926)
Larcophora sophronistis  (Meyrick, 1918)
Magonympha chrysocosma Meyrick, 1916
Mesophleps trychota Meyrick, 1929
Meteoristis religiosa Meyrick, 1923
Mnesistega convexa Meyrick, 1923
Mnesistega talantodes Meyrick, 1918
Musurga sandycitis (Meyrick, 1907)
Mylothra creseritis Meyrick, 1907
Nealyda panchromatica (Meyrick, 1926)
Nothris coercita (Meyrick, 1929)
Nothris hastata (Meyrick, 1918)
Onebala armata Meyrick, 1911
Onebala balteata (Meyrick, 1911)
Onebala brabylitis (Meyrick, 1911)
Onebala foederalis Meyrick, 1923
Onebala infibulata (Meyrick, 1916)
Onebala leptobrocha Meyrick, 1910
Onebala leucograpta Meyrick, 1923
Onebala metriodes Meyrick, 1918
Onebala obscurata (Meyrick, 1911)
Onebala pogonias Meyrick, 1923
Onebala sophronistis Meyrick, 1918
Onebala thiostoma Meyrick, 1929
Onebala victrix (Meyrick, 1911)
Pachnistis arens Meyrick, 1913
Pachnistis cephalochra Meyrick, 1907
Pachnistis inhonesta Meyrick, 1916
Parachronistis destillans Meyrick, 1918
Paradoris anaphracta Meyrick, 1907
Pectinophora gossypiella (Saunders, 1844)
Peucoteles herpestica Meyrick, 1931
Petalostomella lygrodes  (Meyrick, 1931)
Phthorimaea blapsigona Meyrick, 1916
Phthorimaea ergasima Meyrick, 1916
Phthorimaea horoscopa (Meyrick, 1926)
Phthorimaea mixolitha Meyrick, 1918
Phthorimaea operculella Zeller, 1877
Pilocrates prograpta Meyrick, 1920
Pityocona bifurcatus Wadhawan and W alia, 2006
Pityocona xeropis Meyrick, 1918
Polyhymno alcimacha Meyrick, 1918
Protobathra erista Meyrick, 1916
Pseudocrates soritica Meyrick, 1918
Ptocheuusa paupella (Zeller, 1847)
Recurvaria dryozona (Meyrick, 1916)
Recurvaria ochrospila Meyrick, 1934
Sarisphora agorastis Meyrick, 1931
Schemataspis bicunea (Meyrick, 1911)
Scrobipalpa heliopa Lower, 1900
Semnolocha choleroleuca (Meyrick, 1931)
Semnostoma barathrota Meyrick, 1918
Semnostoma leucochalca Meyrick, 1918
Semnostoma poecilopa Meyrick, 1918
Semnostoma scatebrosa Meyrick, 1918
Sitotroga aenictopa Meyrick, 1927
Sitotroga cerealella (Olivier, 1789)
Sitotroga palearis (Meyrick, 1913)
Sphaerolbia chrematistis Meyrick, 1934
Stegasta comissata Meyrick, 1923
Stegasta omelkoi Rose and Pathania, 2004
Stegasta pawani Walia and Wadhawan, 2004
Stegasta valvulata Walia and Wadhawan, 2004
Stegasta variana Meyrick, 1904
Stenolechia deltocausta Meyrick, 1929
Stenolechia frustulenta Meyrick, 1923
Stenolechia marginipunctella (Stainton, 1859)
Stenolechia trichaspis Meyrick, 1918
Stenolechia zelosaris Meyrick, 1923
Stiphrostola longinqua Meyrick, 1923
Stomopteryx nertaria Meyrick, 1918
Stomopteryx praecipitata Meyrick, 1918
Stomopteryx sphenodoxa Meyrick, 1931
Stomopteryx syncrita Meyrick, 1926
Stryphnocopa trinotata Meyrick, 1920
Symmoca acatharta (Meyrick, 1911)
Symmoca alacris Meyrick, 1918
Symmoca amblycryptis Meyrick, 1929
Symmoca amphicalyx (Meyrick, 1911)
Symmoca anthracosema (Meyrick, 1933)
Symmoca corymbitis Meyrick, 1926
Symmoca dolabrata Meyrick, 1916
Symmoca epenthetica Meyrick, 1931
Symmoca hemilyca (Meyrick, 1910)
Symmoca indagata Meyrick, 1918
Symmoca maschalista Meyrick, 1926
Symmoca oxycryptis Meyrick, 1929
Symmoca palacta (Meyrick, 1911)
Symmoca planicola (Meyrick, 1932)
Symmoca rhodota (Meyrick, 1911)
Symmoca stesichora (Meyrick, 1911)
Syncathedra criminata Meyrick, 1923
Syncratomorpha euthetodes Meyrick, 1929
Telphusa atomatma  (Meyrick, 1932)
Telphusa caecigena Meyrick, 1918
Telphusa conviciata Meyrick, 1929
Telphusa destillans Meyrick, 1918
Telphusa improvida Meyrick, 1926
Telphusa inferialis Meyrick, 1918
Telphusa machinata (Meyrick, 1929)
Telphusa melanozona Meyrick, 1913
Telphusa nephelaspis Meyrick, 1926
Telphusa platyphracta Meyrick, 1935
Telphusa tetragrapta  Meyrick, 1937
Telphusa vinolenta (Meyrick, 1919)
Thiotricha acrantha Meyrick, 1908
Thiotricha albicephalata Walia and Wadhawan, 2004
Thiotricha amphixysta Meyrick, 1929
Thiotricha animosella (Walker, 1864)
Thiotricha balanopa Meyrick, 1918
Thiotricha centritis Meyrick, 1908
Thiotricha characias Meyrick, 1918
Thiotricha clidias Meyrick, 1908
Thiotricha clinopeda Meyrick, 1918
Thiotricha complicata Meyrick, 1918
Thiotricha cuneiformis Meyrick, 1918
Thiotricha delacma Meyrick, 1923
Thiotricha epiclista Meyrick, 1908
Thiotricha flagellatrix Meyrick, 1929
Thiotricha galactaea Meyrick, 1908
Thiotricha gemmulans Meyrick, 1931
Thiotricha grammitis Meyrick, 1908
Thiotricha hoplomacha Meyrick, 1908
Thiotricha janitrix Meyrick, 1912
Thiotricha nephodesma Meyrick, 1918
Thiotricha obvoluta Meyrick, 1918
Thiotricha operaria Meyrick, 1918
Thiotricha orthiastis Meyrick, 1905
Thiotricha oxygramma Meyrick, 1918
Thiotricha pancratiastis Meyrick, 1921
Thiotricha polyaula Meyrick, 1918
Thiotricha pteropis Meyrick, 1908
Thiotricha pyrphora Meyrick, 1918
Thiotricha rabida Meyrick, 1929
Thiotricha rhodomicta Meyrick, 1918
Thiotricha rhodopa Meyrick, 1908
Thiotricha scioplecta Meyrick, 1918
Thiotricha synacma Meyrick, 1918
Thiotricha termanthes Meyrick, 1929
Thiotricha xanthaspis Meyrick, 1918
Thyrsostoma albilustra Walia and W adhawan, 2004
Thyrsostoma chelophora Meyrick, 1918
Thyrsostoma diplobathra Meyrick, 1906
Thyrsostoma fissilis Meyrick, 1906
Thyrsostoma glaucitis Meyrick, 1907
Thyrsostoma macrodelta Meyrick, 1918
Thyrsostoma nesoclera Meyrick, 1929
Thyrsostoma pylartis (Meyrick, 1908)
Thyrsostoma shivai Walia and W adhawan, 2004
Timyra corythista Meyrick, 1918
Timyra hydrosema Meyrick, 1916
Timyra rhizophora Meyrick, 1919
Toxotacma meditans Meyrick, 1929
Trachyedra xylomorpha Meyrick, 1929
Trichembola epichorda Meyrick, 1918
Trichembola opisthopa Meyrick, 1918
Trichembola segnis Meyrick, 1918
Trichoboscis pansarista Meyrick, 1929
Trichotaphe amphichlora Meyrick, 1923
Trichotaphe caerulescens Meyrick, 1913
Trichotaphe cellaria Meyrick, 1913
Trichotaphe centracma Meyrick, 1923
Trichotaphe cocta Meyrick, 1913
Trichotaphe corniculata Meyrick, 1913
Trichotaphe crambaleas Meyrick, 1913
Trichotaphe cymatodes Meyrick, 1916
Trichotaphe fungifera Meyrick, 1913
Trichotaphe geochrota Meyrick, 1914
Trichotaphe illucescens Meyrick, 1918
Trichotaphe lissota Meyrick, 1913
Trichotaphe melitura Meyrick, 1916
Trichotaphe procrossa Meyrick, 1913
Trichotaphe sciritis (Meyrick, 1918)
Trichotaphe siranta Meyrick, 1913
Tricyanaula augusta (Meyrick, 1911)
Tricyanaula cyanozona (Meyrick, 1923)
Xystoceros tripleura Meyrick, 1914
Xystophora asthenodes (Meyrick, 1923)
Xystophora defixa (Meyrick, 1929)
Zalithia doxarcha (Meyrick, 1916)
Zalithia enoptrias (Meyrick, 1911)
Zomeutis dicausta Meyrick, 1913

External links
A Check-List Of Microlepidoptera Of India (Part-II: Family Gelechiidae)

 
x
M